Germain Doucet, Sieur de La Verdure (born around 1595 near Couperans en Brye, most likely Coubron northeast of Paris, France) was a French commander in the French colony of Acadia.

Doucet's career began when he entered into an association with Charles de Menou d'Aulnay, noted seaman, captain, and future governor of Acadia. In 1632, he arrived in Acadia with the governor Isaac de Razilly. He served as master of arms of Fort Pentagouet (now Castine, Maine) as a major. After the death of d'Aulnay in 1650, Doucet became commandant serving at the French fort of Port Royal (now Annapolis Royal). Under Major General Robert Sedgwick, the English captured the fort on 15 August 1654. Under the terms of the surrender, Doucet was forced to leave Acadia for good, and returned to France. Both his son Pierre, and his daughter Marguerite stayed behind, however. Another daughter whose name is uncertain also stayed in Acadia and married Pierre Lejeune. A fourth child was seemingly adopted by him, a boy born probably among the Abenaki and baptized around 1641 in Acadia, also named Germain. Pierre married, in 1660, Henriette Pelletret, by whom he had issue. Marguerite married Abraham Dugas. The name of Germain's wife is uncertain, although some genealogists suggest she may have been Marie Bourgeois.

References

Acadian people
Acadian history
French Army officers
1595 births
Year of death unknown
People from Seine-Saint-Denis
People from Castine, Maine
Emigrants from France to Acadia